Ulmus of King & Co nursery, Rayne, or King & Co.'s elm is an elm grown from cuttings taken in the early 1990s from four  old trees surviving near Braintree, Essex, England, amidst others afflicted by Dutch elm disease (DED). The variety, released in 2010, is described by the nursery that marketed it as "English elm". A 2010 genetic test on it referred to it as "English Elm (U. procera)". At Kew it is listed as U. minor Mill., without a cultivar name. 

The Braintree area falls within what R. H. Richens called the Essex hybridization zone, in which, as well as the English Elm clone, elms of mixed origin are present, and variable field elm. The proprietor of the nursery, who in collaboration with the local tree officer took cuttings, bred 2000 trees via micropropagation.

The variety has been sold as a form of "English elm" with a "high resistance" to DED, covered in the national press and BBC, exhibited by the Royal Horticultural Society, and donated to and accessioned by Kew Gardens.

Description
No nursery description of the source trees is available. BBC Essex described the tree as "a smooth-leaved elm", formerly a common name for Ulmus minor subsp. minor now sunk as simply Ulmus minor, the field elm.

Pests and diseases 
All 11 specimens inoculated with the DED pathogen by Dr Jelle Hiemstra, Wageningen University, in the 2015 Noordplant trials in the Netherlands, died rapidly.   A degree of 'field resistance' has been noted in a small number of old field elms in areas of high infectivity. The source trees were reported still in full leaf in 2016.

Cultivation
The variety is only sold in the United Kingdom. Three specimens were donated in 2010 by King and Co to Kew Gardens. The tree was exhibited by the Royal Horticultural Society in 2011. The original batch of two thousand saplings was reported sold by 2017.

References

Elm cultivars
Ulmus articles with images
Ulmus